Renmin Road Subdistrict  is a subdistrict situated in Saihan District, Hohhot, Inner Mongolia, China. , it administers the following nine residential neighborhoods:
Jiankang Community
Dibei Community
Zhinong Community
Shandan Community
Shuiwen Community
Shiqi Community
Xingkang Community
Dianlijiayuan Community
Fuxing Community

See also
List of township-level divisions of Inner Mongolia

References

Township-level divisions of Inner Mongolia
Hohhot
Subdistricts of the People's Republic of China